Betsy Greer is a writer, editor, maker and speaker credited with popularizing the term Craftivism.

Biography 
Greer was born in Cincinnati, Ohio in 1975, and grew up in Charlotte, North Carolina. She received her undergraduate degree in English literature from the University of North Carolina at Chapel Hill (1998) and her M.A. in sociology from Goldsmiths, University of London (2004). Greer currently resides in Durham, North Carolina.

Publications 
 Knitting for Good! (2008)
 Craftivism: The Art of Craft and Activism (2014)

References

External links 
 craft + activism = craftivism
 Rob Walker, The D.I.Y. Revolutionaries Of The Pussyhat Project, The New Yorker, 25 January 2017
 Alexandra Hart, Knitters Turn to Craftivism to Protest Trump's Presidency, Texas Standard, 20 January 2017
 Stephanie Buck, Women Craftivists are Reclaiming Domesticity as a Silent Form of Protest, Timeline, 22 November 2016
 Holley Simmons, Betsy Greer's Craftivism Trades Picket Signs for Knitting Needles, Washington City Paper, 11 June 2014

1975 births
Living people
American women writers
People from Cincinnati
University of North Carolina at Chapel Hill alumni
Alumni of Goldsmiths, University of London
21st-century American women